Tajná is a village and municipality in the Nitra District in western central Slovakia, in the Nitra Region.

History
In historical records the village was first mentioned in 1075.

Geography
The village lies at an altitude of 174 metres and covers an area of 8.482 km2. It has a population of about 288 people.

Ethnicity
The population is about 98% Slovak and 2% Magyar.

Gallery

References

External links
 
 
http://www.statistics.sk/mosmis/eng/run.html

Villages and municipalities in Nitra District